Xinchang is a station on Line 16 of the Shanghai Metro in Pudong, Shanghai. It is connected to a bus stop, and it is only 1 km along South Shenjiang Road from Xinchang Ancient Town.

References

Railway stations in Shanghai
Line 16, Shanghai Metro
Shanghai Metro stations in Pudong
Railway stations in China opened in 2013